Ina Dragomirova Demireva, married name Lutai, (born 17 February 1989) is a Bulgarian former competitive ice dancer. With Juri Kurakin, she is the 2006 Bulgarian national silver medalist. Demireva also competed with Nikolai Bakolov and Tsvetan Georgiev.

Demireva is the younger half-sister of world champion ice dancer Albena Denkova. In April 2010, she married Russian singles skater Andrei Lutai. Their daughter, Sylvia, was born in September 2010.

References

1989 births
Living people
Figure skaters from Sofia
Bulgarian female ice dancers